Chindamba is classified as a Bantu language. It is one of 87 languages spoken in Tanzania. Most Chindamba speakers are bilingual in Swahili and Chindamba.

References 

Kilombero languages
Languages of Tanzania